The 1981 World Rowing Championships were World Rowing Championships that were held from 30 August to 6 September 1981 at Oberschleißheim outside Munich, West Germany.

Medal summary

Men's events

Women's events

Medal table

References

Rowing competitions in Germany
World Rowing Championships
World Rowing Championships
Rowing
Rowing
World Rowing Championships
World Rowing Championships